William Street School, also known as Horace Mann School, is a historic school building located at Huntington, Huntington County, Indiana.  The original section was built in 1895, and is a -story, rectangular plan brick building with Romanesque Revival and Queen Anne style design elements.  It sits on a raised basement, has a rounded corner and projecting gable, bell tower, and has a multi-gabled slate roof.  A two-story, Neoclassical style addition was built in 1926.

It was listed on the National Register of Historic Places in 1986. It is located in the Drover Town Historic District.

References

School buildings on the National Register of Historic Places in Indiana
Queen Anne architecture in Indiana
Romanesque Revival architecture in Indiana
Neoclassical architecture in Indiana
School buildings completed in 1895
Schools in Huntington County, Indiana
National Register of Historic Places in Huntington County, Indiana
Historic district contributing properties in Indiana
1895 establishments in Indiana